Yusuf Effendi (born 5 June 1988) is the Indonesian professional footballer, who plays as a winger for Liga 2 club Persiba Balikpapan.

Career statistics

Club

Honours

Club
Pro Duta
 Indonesian Premier League: 2013

References

External links
 Yusuf Effendi at Soccerway
 Yusuf Effendi at Liga Indonesia

Indonesian footballers
1988 births
Living people
Pro Duta FC players
Gresik United players
Persiba Balikpapan players
Liga 1 (Indonesia) players
Liga 2 (Indonesia) players
People from Banyuwangi Regency
Sportspeople from East Java
Association football forwards